This is a list of submarine topographical features, oceanic landforms and topographic elements.

Abyssal plain
Lying generally between the foot of a continental rise and a mid-ocean ridge, abyssal plains are among the flattest, smoothest and least explored regions on Earth. Abyssal plains are key geologic elements of oceanic basins (the other elements being an elevated mid-ocean ridge and flanking abyssal hills). In addition to these elements, active oceanic basins (those that are associated with a moving plate tectonic boundary) also typically include an oceanic trench and a subduction zone. Abyssal plains cover more than 33% of the ocean floor (about 23% of Earth's surface), but they are poorly preserved in the sedimentary record because they tend to be consumed by the subduction process.

The abyssal plain is formed when the lower oceanic crust is melted and forced upwards by the asthenosphere layer of the upper mantle. As this basaltic material reaches the surface at mid-ocean ridges, it forms new oceanic crust. Abyssal plains result from the blanketing of an originally uneven surface of oceanic crust by fine-grained sediments, mainly clay and silt. Much of this sediment is deposited from turbidity currents that have been channeled from the continental margins along submarine canyons down into deeper water. The remainder of the sediment is composed chiefly of pelagic sediments.

Use of a continuously recording fathometer enabled Tolstoy & Ewing in the summer of 1947 to identify and describe the first abyssal plain. This plain, located to the south of Newfoundland, is now known as the Sohm Abyssal Plain. Following this discovery many other examples were found in all the oceans.

List of abyssal plains and oceanic basins

Following is a list of named abyssal plains and oceanic basins:

Oceanic trenches

Oceanic trenches are long, narrow topographic depressions of the seabed. They are the deepest parts of the ocean floor, and they define one of the most important natural boundaries on the Earth's solid surface: the one between two lithospheric plates. Trenches are a distinctive morphological feature of plate boundaries. Trenches are found in all oceans with the exception of the Arctic Ocean and they are most common in the North and South Pacific Oceans.

There are three types of lithospheric plate boundaries: 1.) divergent (where lithosphere and oceanic crust is created at mid-ocean ridges), 2.) convergent (where one lithospheric plate sinks beneath another and returns to the mantle), and 3.) transform (where two lithospheric plates slide past each other).

An oceanic trench is a type of convergent boundary at which two oceanic lithospheric slabs meet; the older (and therefore denser) of these slabs flexes and subducts beneath the other slab. Oceanic lithosphere moves into trenches at a global rate of about a tenth of a square meter per second. Trenches are generally parallel to a volcanic island arc, and about 200 km from a volcanic arc. Oceanic trenches typically extend 3 to 4 km (1.9 to 2.5 mi) below the level of the surrounding oceanic floor. The greatest ocean depth to be sounded is in the Challenger Deep of the Mariana Trench, at a depth of 10,911 m (35,798 ft) below sea level.

List of oceanic trenches

The following is a list of the deepest parts of the Earth's oceans and seas (all depths are measured from sea level):

Entries marked with * are the deepest parts of their respective water bodies, but are not oceanic trenches.

Oceanic plateau
An oceanic plateau is a large, relatively flat submarine region that rises well above the level of the ambient seabed. While many oceanic plateaus are composed of continental crust, and often form a step interrupting the continental slope, some plateaus are undersea remnants of large igneous provinces. Continental crust has the highest amount of silicon (such rock is called felsic). Oceanic crust has a smaller amount of silicon (mafic rock).

The anomalous volcanism associated with the formation of oceanic plateaux at the time of the Cenomanian–Turonian boundary (90.4 million years) ago may have been responsible for the environmental disturbances that occurred at that time. The physical manifestations of this were elevated atmospheric and oceanic temperatures, a significant sea-level transgression, and a period of widespread anoxia, leading to the extinction of 26% of all genera. These eruptions would also have resulted in the emission of large quantities of carbon dioxide into the atmosphere, leading to global warming. This runaway greenhouse effect was probably put into reverse by the decline of the anomalous volcanic activity and by increased -driven productivity in oceanic surface waters, leading to increased organic carbon burial, black shale deposition, anoxia and mass extinction in the ocean basins.

List of oceanic plateaus

Campbell Plateau (South Pacific)
Challenger Plateau (South Pacific)
Agulhas Plateau (Southwest Indian)
Caribbean–Colombian Plateau (Caribbean)
Exmouth Plateau (Indian)
Hikurangi Plateau (Southwest Pacific)
Kerguelen Plateau (Indian)
Manihiki Plateau (Southwest Pacific)
Marquesas Plateau (Southwest Pacific)
Mascarene Plateau (Indian)
Naturaliste Plateau (Indian)
Ontong Java Plateau (Southwest Pacific)
Shatsky Rise (North Pacific)
Vøring Plateau (North Atlantic)
Wrangellia Terrane (Northeast Pacific)
Yermak Plateau (Arctic)

Mid-ocean ridges
A mid-ocean ridge is a general term for an underwater mountain system that consists of various mountain ranges (chains), typically having a valley known as a rift running along its spine, formed by plate tectonics. This type of oceanic ridge is characteristic of what is known as an oceanic spreading center, which is responsible for seafloor spreading.

List of mid-ocean ridges

Aden Ridge
American–Antarctic Ridge
Carlsberg Ridge
Central Indian Ridge
Chile Rise
Cocos Ridge
East Pacific Rise
East Scotia Ridge
Explorer Ridge
Gakkel Ridge (Mid-Arctic Ridge)
Gorda Ridge
Juan de Fuca Ridge
Knipovich Ridge (between Greenland and Spitsbergen)
Kolbeinsey Ridge (North of Iceland)
Mid-Atlantic Ridge
Mohns Ridge
Norfolk Ridge
Pacific–Antarctic Ridge
Palau–Kyushu Ridge
Reykjanes Ridge (south of Iceland)
Southeast Indian Ridge
Southwest Indian Ridge
West Mariana Ridge

See also

Physical oceanography
Bathymetry
Challenger Deep
Hadal zone
List of oceanic landforms
List of seamounts by summit depth
Seamount
Submarine canyon

References

Further reading

External links

Lists of landforms
Marine geology
Abyssal plains
Oceanic plateaus
Oceanic ridges
Oceanic trenches
Plate tectonics